Christian Preußer (born 23 January 1984) is a German football manager.

Coaching career
Preußer managed Rot-Weiß Erfurt's under-19 team before signing a contract to manage the senior team until mid-2015 on 24 March 2015. The contract was extended until 2016 on 21 April 2015. He was sacked on 15 December 2015.

On 1 July 2016, Preußer was appointed manager of Oberliga Baden-Württemberg team SC Freiburg II. He achieved promotion to the Regionalliga Südwest in his first season and established the side as one of the top teams in the league. Under his reign more than 20 players from the second team made it into professional football.

In February 2021, Preußer announced his intention to leave the club in the summer, in search of a "new challenge". In May 2021, he signed a two-year contract with 2. Bundesliga club Fortuna Düsseldorf, starting from the 2021–22 season. He was sacked on 8 February 2022. In the following summer, he was signed by Borussia Dortmund II. He was sacked in February 2023.

Coaching record

References

External links

Living people
1984 births
Sportspeople from Berlin
German football managers
2. Bundesliga managers
3. Liga managers
FC Rot-Weiß Erfurt managers
Fortuna Düsseldorf managers
Borussia Dortmund II managers